State Highway 104 is a state highway in the state of Karnataka connecting Bangalore with Nandi Hills via Devanahalli and Bagalur. In 2008, it was considered as an alternate access route to the Bengaluru International Airport.

See also 
 National Highway 7 (India)

References 

Roads in Chikkaballapur district
Roads in Bangalore Urban district